Herry may refer to:

People
 Herry Iman Pierngadi (born 1962), Indonesian badminton coach
 Herry Janto Setiawan (born 1973), Indonesian cyclist
 Herry Kiswanto (born 1955), Indonesian football manager and player
 Herry Saliku Biembe (born 1981), Congolese boxer
 Herry Susilo (born 1988), Indonesian football player
 Jeanne Herry (born 1978), French filmmaker and actress

Places
 Herry, Cher, Centre-Val de Loire, France

Other
 Herry Hercules, character in Class of the Titans
 Herry Monster, character in Sesame Street